Probable global transcription activator SNF2L1 is a protein that in humans is encoded by the SMARCA1 gene.

The protein encoded by this gene is a member of the SWI/SNF family of proteins. Members of this family have helicase and ATPase activities and are thought to regulate transcription of certain genes by altering the chromatin structure around those genes. Two transcript variants encoding different isoforms have been found for this gene.

References

Further reading